Video games have been included in versions of the Microsoft Windows line of operating systems, starting from Windows 1.0x, all published by Microsoft. Some games that have appeared in Microsoft Entertainment Pack and Microsoft Plus! have been included in subsequent versions of Windows as well. Microsoft Solitaire has been included in every version of Windows since Windows 3.0, except Windows 8 and 8.1. The current version of Windows, Windows 11, includes Microsoft Solitaire Collection and Surf.

History 
Microsoft planned to include games when developing Windows 1.0 in 1983–1984. Two games were initially developed, Puzzle and Chess, but were scrapped in favor of Reversi, based on the board game of the same name. Reversi was included in Windows versions up to Windows 3.1. Solitaire was developed in 1988 by the intern Wes Cherry. The card deck itself was designed by Susan Kare, who was known for her work on icon designs for the original Macintosh.

Microsoft intended Solitaire to "soothe people intimidated by the operating system," and at a time where many users were still unfamiliar with graphical user interfaces, it proved useful in familiarizing them with the use of a mouse, such as the drag-and-drop technique required for moving cards. According to Microsoft telemetry, Solitaire was among the three most-used Windows programs and FreeCell was seventh, ahead of productivity-based applications such as Microsoft Word and Excel. Lost business productivity by employees playing Solitaire became a common concern since being a default inclusion in Windows.

The Microsoft Hearts Network was included with Windows for Workgroups 3.1, as a showcase of NetDDE technology by enabling multiple players to play simultaneously across a computer network. The Microsoft Hearts Network would later be renamed Internet Hearts, and included in Windows Me and XP, alongside other online multiplayer-based titles. 3D Pinball for Windows – Space Cadet is a version of the "Space Cadet" pinball table from the 1995 video game Full Tilt! Pinball.

In Minesweeper for Windows Vista and 7, the game comes with an alternate "Flower Garden" style, alongside the default "Minesweeper" style. This is due to controversy over the original land mine theme of the game being potentially insensitive, and the "Flower Garden" style was used as the default theme in "sensitive areas".

Support for Internet games for Windows Me and XP ended on July 31, 2019, and for Windows 7 on January 22, 2020.

Several third party games, such as Candy Crush Saga and Disney Magic Kingdoms, have been included as advertisements on the Start menu in Windows 10, and may also be automatically installed by the operating system. Windows 11 includes the Xbox app, which allows users to access the PC Game Pass video game subscription service. Additionally, versions of the Microsoft Edge browser (bundled with Windows 10 and 11) from 2020 onwards include the Surf game.

Microsoft Casual Games 
Starting from 2012 onwards, with the release of Windows 8, updated versions of previously bundled games are now under the brand Microsoft Casual Games, in addition to several brand new games. With the exception of Solitaire Collection being included in Windows 10 and 11, these games are not included with Windows, and are instead available as ad-supported free downloads in Microsoft Store.

Premium monthly and annual subscriptions are available, which removes advertisements and offers several gameplay benefits, a move that has been criticized by reviewers as a way to "nickel and dime" users, since previous versions of Solitaire and previously bundled games did not include any advertisements or paid subscriptions.

List of Microsoft Casual Games developed for Windows

 Solitaire Collection
 Minesweeper
 Mahjong
 Ultimate Word Games
 Treasure Hunt
 Sudoku

Included games

See also 
 Microsoft Entertainment Pack
 List of Microsoft Windows components

Notes

References

External links 
 Microsoft Casual Games website

Windows components
Windows games
Casual games
Microsoft franchises
Microsoft games
Video games developed in the United States